Petrovaradin is a historic town in the Serbian province of Vojvodina, now a part of the city of Novi Sad. As of 2011, the urban area has 14,810 inhabitants. Lying on the right bank of the Danube, across from the main part of Novi Sad, it is built around the Petrovaradin Fortress, the historical anchor of the modern city.

Name
Petrovaradin was founded by the Celts, but its original name is unknown. During Roman administration it was known as Cusum. After the Romans conquered the region from the Celtic tribe of Scordisci, they built the Cusum fortress where present Petrovaradin Fortress now stands. In addition, the town received its name from the Byzantines, who called it Petrikon or Petrikov (Πετρικον) and who presumably named it after Saint Peter.

In documents from 1237, the town was first mentioned under the name Peturwarod (Pétervárad), which was named after Hungarian lord Peter, son of Töre. Petrovaradin was known under the name Pétervárad during Hungarian administration, Varadin or Petervaradin during Ottoman administration, and Peterwardein during Habsburg administration.

Today, the municipality is known in Serbian as Петроварадин, in Hungarian as Pétervárad, and in German as Peterwardein.

Geography
Petrovaradin is located in the Syrmia region, on the Danube river and Fruška Gora, a horst mountain with elevation of 78–220 m (municipality up to 451 m). The northern part of Fruška Gora consists of massive landslide zones, but they are not active, except in Ribnjak neighborhood (between Sremska Kamenica and Petrovaradin fortress).

History

Human settlement in the territory of present-day Petrovaradin has been traced as far back as the Stone Age (about 4500 BC). This region was conquered by Celts (in the 4th century BC) and Romans (in the 1st century BC).

The Celts founded the first fortress at this location. It was part of the tribal state of the Scordisci, which had its capital in Singidunum (present-day Belgrade). During the Roman administration, a larger fortress was built (in the 1st century) with the name Cusum and was included into Roman Pannonia. Subsequently, the fortress was included into the Pannonia Inferior and the Pannonia Secunda. In the 5th century, Cusum was devastated by the invasion of the Huns.

The town was then conquered by Ostrogoths, Gepids, and Lombards. By the end of the 5th century, Byzantines had reconstructed the town and called it by the names Cusum and Petrikon or Petrikov. It was part of the Byzantine province of Pannonia. Subsequently, it passed into the hands of Avars, Franks, Bulgarians and Byzantines again. During Bulgarian administration, the town was known as Petrik and was part of the domain of duke Sermon, while during subsequent Byzantine administration, it was part of the Theme of Sirmium.

Later, the town became part of the Kingdom of Hungary.

Between 1522 and 1526, Petrovaradin was a base for the early Ŝajkaš regiments, but in 1526, the Ottoman Empire took Petrovaradin after a two-week battle waged against combined forces of Croats, Serbs and Hungarians.

In the war of 1683-1699 with the Habsburg monarchy, the Ottomans abandoned Petrovaradin. In 1690, they returned for just two years. After that, Petrovaradin remained under Habsburg control as a part of the Slavonian Military Frontier.

In 1695, a military force of Serbs—600 infantry and 200 cavalry—under Captain Pane Božić were brought to Petrovaradin to serve. One thousand Serbs worked on the construction of the Citadel and fortifications under the guidance of military engineer Sébastien Le Prestre de Vauban.

During Hungarian administration, the town was firstly part of the Bolgyán County and then part of the Syrmia County, while during Ottoman administration, it was firstly part of the vassal duchy of Syrmia ruled by Serb duke Radoslav Čelnik (1527–1530), and then part of the Sanjak of Syrmia.

During the Ottoman administration, Petrovaradin had 200 houses and three mosques. There was also a Christian quarter with 35 houses populated with Croats.

Petrovaradin was the site of a notable battle on August 5, 1716 in which the Habsburg monarchy led by the Prince Eugene of Savoy defeated the forces of the Ottomans led by the Silahdar Damat Ali Pasha. Habsburg forces led by Prince Eugene later defeated the Ottomans at Belgrade before the Ottomans sued for peace at Požarevac.

During the Habsburg administration, Petrovaradin was part of the Habsburg Military Frontier (Slavonian general command - Petrovaradin regiment). In 1848–49, the town was part of Serbian Vojvodina, but in 1849, it was returned under the administration of the Military Frontier. With the abolishment of the Military Frontier in 1881, the town was included into the Syrmia County of Croatia-Slavonia, which was the autonomous kingdom within Austria-Hungary.

In 1918, the town firstly became part of the State of Slovenes, Croats and Serbs, then part of the Kingdom of Serbia and finally part of the Kingdom of Serbs, Croats and Slovenes (later known as Yugoslavia). Between 1918 and 1922, the town was part of the Syrmia County, between 1922 and 1929 part of the Syrmia Oblast, and between 1929 and 1941 part of the Danube Banovina, a province of the Kingdom of Yugoslavia. From 1918 to 1936, Yugoslav Royal Air Force was based in Petrovaradin. During World War II (1941–1944), the town was occupied by the Axis Powers and it was attached to the Independent State of Croatia. Since the end of the war in this part of Yugoslavia in 1944, the town was part of the Autonomous Province of Vojvodina, which from 1945 was part of the new socialist Serbia within socialist Yugoslavia.

Settlements and neighborhoods

Neighborhoods and parts of Petrovaradin are: Petrovaradin Fortress, Podgrađe Tvrđave (which is a fortified part of Petrovaradin and part of Petrovaradin Fortress complex), Stari Majur (which is part of Petrovaradin where offices of Petrovaradin local community are located), Novi Majur, Bukovački Plato (Bukovački Put), Sadovi, Široka Dolina, Širine, Vezirac, Trandžament, Ribnjak, Mišeluk, Alibegovac, Radna Zona Istok, Marija Snežna (Radna Zona Istok), and Petrovaradinska Ada (Ribarska Ada).

Between 2002 and 2019, Petrovaradin had a status of separate municipality within the city of Novi Sad, but its administrative bodies were never established and the status was mostly formal. Apart from the town, the municipality covered the area on the right Danube bank: town of Sremska Kamenica; and villages of Stari Ledinci, Novi Ledinci and Bukovac, with some 34,000 residents in total. The municipality status was terminated by a City Assembly decision in 2019.

Demographics

In 1961 Petrovaradin had 8,408 inhabitants; in 1971 10,477; in 1981 10,338; in 1991 11,285; and in 2002 13,973. By city's registry estimation, from mid-2005, Petrovaradin town had 15,266 inhabitants.

Ethnic groups
Municipality
According to the 2011 census, the total population of the territory of present-day Petrovaradin municipality was 33,865, of whom 27,328 (80.69%) were ethnic Serbs. All settlements in the municipality have an ethnic Serb majority.

Town

During the Ottoman administration, Petrovaradin was mostly populated by Muslims, while some Serbs lived there as well in the Christian quarter. According to Habsburg census from 1720, inhabitants of Petrovaradin mostly had German and Serbo-Croatian names and surnames. During the subsequent period of the Habsburg administration and in the first part of the 20th century, the largest ethnic group in the Petrovaradin town were ethnic Croats. According to the 1910 census the town had 5,527 residents, of which 3,266 spoke Croatian (59.09%), 894 German (16.18%), 730 Serbian (13.21%), 521 Hungarian (9.43%) and 159 Slovak (2.88%). Since 1971 census, largest ethnic group in Petrovaradin are Serbs. Today, there are a couple of neighborhoods with sizable number of Croats in Petrovaradin, like Stari Majur and Podgrađe Tvrđave.

Economy
The following table gives a preview of total number of employed people per their core activity (as of 2017):

Politics

Between 1980 and 1989, Petrovaradin was a municipality within the city of Novi Sad. From 1989 to 2002, Novi Sad's municipalities were abolished and territory of the former Petrovaradin municipality was part of Novi Sad municipality, which included the whole territory of the present-day City of Novi Sad. The city municipalities of Novi Sad were formally re-established in 2002, with Petrovaradin as the second one, since it was a requirement to obtain a city status at the time. In 2007, after the update of the law of local government, the requirement for multiple municipalities for city status was lifted (and 20 additional cities were proclaimed). However, the renewed 2008 city statute also foresaw formation of two separate municipalities, but they have never been established, and the whole city was run solely by the city administration. Petrovaradin only has a local community office. In March 2019, a new city statute was adopted, abolishing any separate municipalities.

Culture

Notable people
 Anton Hasenhut (1766–1841), Austrian comic actor
 Josip Jelačić (1801–1859), Croatian ban and army general, born in Petrovaradin.
 Christian von Steeb, (1848–1921), Austrian surveyor and infantry general
 Franjo Štefanović (1879–1924), Croatian composer and writer
 Margarethe von Flindt (1880–after 1902), Austrian theater actress
 Karl Wolff (1890–1963), Austrian lawyer, university lecturer and constitutional judge
 Kosta Nađ, (1911–1986), general in the Yugoslav National Liberation Army

See also
 List of places in Serbia
 List of cities, towns and villages in Vojvodina

Notes and references
Notes
 Petrovaradin, Enciklopedija Novog Sada, knjiga 20, Novi Sad, 2002
 Radenko Gajić, Petrovaradinska tvrđava - Gibraltar na Dunavu, Sremski Karlovci, 1993
 mr Agneš Ozer, Petrovaradinska tvrđava - vodič kroz vreme i prostor, Novi Sad, 2002
 mr Agneš Ozer, Petrovaradin Fortress - A Guide through time and space, Novi Sad, 2002
 Veljko Milković, Petrovaradin kroz legendu i stvarnost, Novi Sad, 2001
 Veljko Milković, Petrovaradin i Srem - misterija prošlosti, Novi Sad, 2003
 Veljko Milković, Petrovaradinska tvrđava - podzemlje i nadzemlje, Novi Sad, 2005
 Military Heritage did a feature about the Muslim Turks versus Christian Nobility 1716 battle and crusade at Peterwardein, and the success of Prince Eugene of Savoy (Ludwig Heinrich Dyck, Military Heritage, August 2005, Volume 7, No. 1, pp 48 to 53, and p. 78), ISSN 1524-8666.
 Henderson, Nicholas. Prince Eugene of Savoy. London: Weidenfeld and Nicolson. 1964
 Mckay, Derek. Prince Eugene of Savoy. London: Thames and Hudson. 1977
 Nicolle, David and Hook, Christa. The Janissaries. Botley: Osprey Publishing. 2000
 Setton, Kenneth M. Venice, Austria, and the Turks in the Seventeenth Century. Philadelphia: The American Philosophical Society. 1991

References

External links

 Petrovaradin Fortress 360Virtual Tour
 Novi Sad Interactive Map

 
Populated places on the Danube
Populated places in South Bačka District
Municipalities of Novi Sad
Roman towns and cities in Serbia
Populated places in Syrmia
Novi Sad neighborhoods
Towns in Serbia